The Poland national under-18 baseball team is the national under-18 team representing Poland in international baseball competitions. The organization is currently ranked 58th in the world by the World Baseball Softball Confederation.  They compete in the bi-annual European Junior Baseball Championship.

See also
 Poland national baseball team
 U-18 Baseball World Cup

References

National under-18
National under-18 baseball teams
Baseball